Parambassis altipinnis, commonly known as the high-finned glass perchlet, is a species of fish in the family Ambassidae. It is endemic to West Papua in Indonesia.

References

altipinnis
Freshwater fish of Western New Guinea
Fish described in 1982
Taxonomy articles created by Polbot